Offshoring is the relocation of a business process from one country to another—typically an operational process, such as manufacturing, or supporting processes, such as accounting. Usually this refers to a company business, although state governments may also employ offshoring. More recently, technical and administrative services have been offshored.

Offshoring and outsourcing are not mutually inclusive: there can be one without the other. They can be intertwined (offshore outsourcing), and can be individually or jointly, partially or completely reversed, involving terms such as reshoring, inshoring, and insourcing.

Offshoring is when the offshored work is done by means of an internal (captive) delivery model, sometimes referred to as in-house offshore.

Imported services from subsidiaries or other closely related suppliers are included, whereas intermediate goods, such as partially completed
cars or computers, may not be.

Motivation
Lower cost and increased corporate profitability are often the motivation, economists call this labor arbitrage. More recently, offshoring incentives also include access to qualified personnel abroad, in particular in technical professions, and decreasing the time to market.

Jobs are added in the destination country providing the goods or services and are subtracted from the higher-cost labor country. The increased safety net costs of the unemployed may be absorbed by the government (taxpayers) in the high-cost country or by the company doing the offshoring. Europe experienced less offshoring than the United States due to policies that applied more costs to corporations and cultural barriers.

Destinations
After its accession to the World Trade Organization (WTO) in 2001, the People's Republic of China emerged as a prominent destination for production offshoring. Another focus area has been the software industry as part of global software development and developing global information systems. After technical progress in telecommunications improved the possibilities of trade in services, India became one prominent destination for such offshoring, though many parts of the world are now emerging as offshore destinations.

Frequently used terms
Offshoring is defined as the movement of a business process done at a company in one country to the same company in another country.

It is not the same as outsourcing, which is the movement of internal business processes to an external organizational unit. This is done under restrictions and strategies in order to establish consistency with the offshore outsourcing organizations. Many companies nowadays outsource various professional areas in the company such as e-mail services, payroll and call center. These jobs are being handled by other organizations that specialize in each sector allowing the offshoring company to focus more on other business concerns.

Subcontracting in the same country would be outsourcing, but not offshoring. A company moving an internal business unit from one country to another would be offshoring or physical restructuring, but not outsourcing. A company subcontracting a business unit to a different company in another country would be both outsourcing and offshoring: Offshore outsourcing.

Related terms include 
 nearshoring, - relocation of business processes to (typically) lower cost foreign locations, but in close geographical proximity (e.g., shifting United States-based business processes to Canada, Mexico or Latin America)
 inshoring, - picking services within a country
 bestshoring or rightshoring, picking the "best shore" based on various criteria 
 Business process outsourcing (BPO) refers to outsourcing arrangements when entire business functions (such as finance, accounting, and customer service) are outsourced. More specific terms can be found in the field of software development - for example Global Information System as a class of systems being developed for / by globally distributed teams.
 Bodyshopping is the practice of using offshored resources and personnel to do small disaggregated tasks within a business environment, without any broader intention to offshore an entire business function.

Offshoring can be seen in the context of either production offshoring or services offshoring, and refers to substitution of a service from any company-owned foreign source for one formerly produced in the company's home country, whether or not outsourcing is involved.

Production offshoring
Production offshoring, also known as physical restructuring, of established products involves relocation of physical manufacturing processes overseas, usually to a lower-cost destination or one with fewer regulatory restrictions.

Physical restructuring arrived when the North American Free Trade Agreement (NAFTA) made it easier for manufacturers to shift production facilities from the US to Mexico.

This trend later shifted to China, which offered cheap prices through very low wage rates, few workers' rights laws, a fixed currency pegged to the US dollar, (currently fixed to a basket of economies) cheap loans, cheap land, and factories for new companies, few environmental regulations, and huge economies of scale based on cities with populations over a million workers dedicated to producing a single kind of product. However, many companies are reluctant to move high value-added production of leading-edge products to China because of lax enforcement of intellectual property laws.

IT-enabled services offshoring
Growth of offshoring of IT-enabled services, both to subsidiaries and to outside companies (offshore outsourcing) is linked to the availability of large amounts of reliable and affordable communication infrastructure following the telecommunication and Internet expansion of the late 1990s.

Much of the job movement, however, was to outside companies - offshore outsourcing.

Re-shoring
Reshoring, also known as onshoring, backshoring  or inshoring, is the act of reintroducing domestic manufacturing to a country. It is the reverse process of offshoring.

John Urry, professor of sociology at Lancaster University, argues that the concealment of income, the avoidance of taxation and eluding legislation relating to work, finance, pleasure, waste, energy and security may be becoming a serious concern for democratic governments and ordinary citizens who may be adversely affected by unregulated, offshore activities. Further, the rising costs of transportation could lead to production nearer the point of consumption becoming more economically viable, particularly as new technologies such as additive manufacturing mature.

The World Bank's 2019 World Development Report on the future of work considers the potential for automation to drive companies to reshore production, reducing the role of labor in the process, and offers suggestions as to how governments can respond. A similar movement can be seen related to Robotic Process Automation, called RPA or RPAAI for self-guided RPA 2.0 based on artificial intelligence, where the incentive to move repetitive shared services work to lower cost countries is partially taken away by the progression of technology.

Melanie Rojas et al in a 2022 Deloitte's report commend adopting a combination of re-shoring and friendshoring - "working with other nations and trusted supply sources" - as a business practice and policy initiative aiming to promote supply chain resilience.

United States
Since the 1980s American companies have been "offshoring" and outsourcing manufacturing to low cost countries such as India, China, Malaysia, Pakistan and Vietnam.

Government response
President Obama's 2011 SelectUSA program was the first federal program to promote and facilitate U.S. investment in partnership with the states. This program and website helps companies connect with resources available on a Federal, State and local level. In January 2012, President Obama issued a call to action to "invest in America" at the White House "Insourcing American Jobs" Forum.

Success stories
Advances in 3D printing technologies brought manufacturers closer to their customers.

There have been several very successful stories of companies. In most cases hundreds if not thousands of jobs were created or reinstated. In the case of Starbucks, in 2012 it saved American Mug and Stein Company in East Liverpool, Ohio from bankruptcy.

Avoiding failure
Some cases of reshoring have not been successful. Otis Elevators' reshoring effort did not go well. Otis says it failed to consider the consequences of the new location and tried to do too much at once, including a supply-chain software implementation. This is not an uncommon reshoring scenario. Bringing manufacturing back to the United States isn't so simple, and there are a lot of considerations and analyses that companies must do to determine the costs and feasibility of reshoring. Some companies pursue reshoring with their own internal staff. But reshoring projects are complicated and involve engineering, marketing, production, finance, and procurement. In addition, there are real estate concerns, government incentives and training requirements that require outreach to the community. To help with these projects, companies often turn to consultants that specialize in reshoring.

United Kingdom
In the United Kingdom, companies have used the reintroduction of domestic call centres as a unique selling point. In 2014, the RSA Insurance Group completed a move of call centres back to Britain. The call centre industry in India has been hit by reshoring, as businesses including British Telecom, Santander UK and Aviva all announced they would move operations back to Britain in order to boost the economy and regain customer satisfaction.

R&D offshoring
Product design, research and the development (R&D) process is relatively difficult to offshore because R&D, to improve products and create new reference designs, requires a higher skill set not associated with cheap labor.

An abstract of a study published 2019, which did not include either India or China, and did not specify whether the offshoring was also outsourcing, said "that R&D offshoring contributes positively to productivity in the home country.".

Transfer of intellectual property
There is a relationship between offshoring and patent-system strength. Companies under a strong patent system are not afraid to move work offshore because their work will remain their property. Conversely, companies in countries with weak patent systems have an increased fear of intellectual property theft from foreign vendors or workers, and, therefore, have less offshoring.

Offshoring is often enabled by the transfer of valuable information to the offshore site. Such information and training enables the remote workers to produce results of comparable value previously produced by internal employees. When such transfer includes protected materials, as confidential documents and trade secrets, protected by non-disclosure agreements, then intellectual property has been transferred or exported. The documentation and valuation of such exports is quite difficult, but should be considered since it comprises items that may be regulated or taxable.

Debate
Offshoring to foreign subsidiaries has been a controversial issue spurring heated debates among economists. Jobs go to the destination country and lower cost of goods and services to the origin country.

On the other hand, job losses and wage erosion in developed countries have sparked opposition. Free trade with low-wage countries is win-lose for many employees who find their jobs offshored or with stagnating wages.

Currency manipulation by governments and their central banks cause differences in labor cost. On May 1, 2002, Economist and former Ambassador Ernest H. Preeg testified before the Senate committee on Banking, Housing, and Urban Affairs that China, for instance, pegs its currency to the dollar at a sub-par value in violation of Article IV of the International Monetary Fund Articles of Agreement which state that no nation shall manipulate its currency to gain a market advantage.

Competitive concerns
In 2015, IT employment in the United States has recently reached pre-2001 levels and has been rising since.

The number of jobs lost to offshoring is less than 1 percent of the total US labor market. According to a study by the Heritage foundation, outsourcing represents a very small proportion of jobs lost in the US. The total number of jobs lost to offshoring, both manufacturing and technical represent only 4 percent of the total jobs lost in the US. Major reasons for cutting jobs are from contract completion and downsizing. Some economists and commentators claim that the offshoring phenomenon is way overblown.

Impact on jobs in western countries
The Economist reported in January 2013 that "High levels of unemployment in Western countries after the 2007-2008 financial crisis have made the public in many countries so hostile towards offshoring that many companies are now reluctant to engage in it." Economist Paul Krugman wrote in 2007 that while free trade among high-wage countries is viewed as win-win, free trade with low-wage countries is win-lose for many employees who find their jobs offshored or with stagnating wages.

Two estimates of the impact of offshoring on U.S. jobs were between 150,000 and 300,000 per year from 2004–2015. This represents 10-15% of U.S. job creation.

The increased safety net costs of the unemployed may be absorbed by the government (taxpayers) in the high-cost country or by the company doing the offshoring. Europe experienced less offshoring than the U.S. due to policies that applied more costs to corporations and cultural barriers.

In the area of service research has found that offshoring has mixed effects on wages and employment.

The World Bank's 2019 World Development Report on the future of work  highlights how offshoring can shape the demand for skills in receiving countries and explores how increasing automation can lead to reshoring of production in some cases.

Public opinion
U.S. opinion polls indicate that between 76-95% of Americans surveyed agreed that "outsourcing of production and manufacturing work to foreign countries is a reason the U.S. economy is struggling and more people aren't being hired."

Effects of factor of production mobility
According to classical economics, the three factors of production are land, labor, and capital. Offshoring relies heavily on the mobility of labor and capital; land has little or no mobility potential.

In microeconomics, working capital funds the initial costs of offshoring. If the state heavily regulates how a corporation can spend its working capital, it will not be able to offshore its operations. For the same reason the macroeconomy must be free for offshoring to succeed.

Computers and the Internet made work in the services industry electronically portable. Most theories that argue offshoring eventually benefits domestic workers assume that those workers will be able to obtain new jobs, even if by accepting lower salaries or by retraining themselves in a new field. Foreign workers benefit from new jobs and higher wages when the work moves to them.

Labor scholars argue that global labor arbitrage leads to unethical practices, connected to exploitation of workers, eroding work conditions and decreasing job security.

History
In the developed world, moving manufacturing jobs out of the country dates to at least the 1960s while moving knowledge service jobs offshore dates to the 1970s and has continued since then. It was characterized primarily by the transferring of factories from the developed to the developing world. This offshoring and closing of factories has caused a structural change in the developed world from an industrial to a post-industrial service society.

During the 20th century, the decreasing costs of transportation and communication combined with great disparities on pay rates made increased offshoring from wealthier countries to less wealthy countries financially feasible for many companies. Further, the growth of the Internet, particularly fiber-optic intercontinental long haul capacity, and the World Wide Web reduced "transportation" costs for many kinds of information work to near zero.

Impact of the Internet
Regardless of size, companies benefit from accessibility to labor resources across the world. This gave rise to business models such as Remote In-Sourcing that allow companies to tap into resources found abroad, without losing control over security of product quality.

New categories of work such as call centres, computer programming, reading medical data such as X-rays and magnetic resonance imaging, medical transcription, income tax preparation, and title searching are being offshored.

Ireland
Before the 1990s, Ireland was one of the poorest countries in the EU. Because of Ireland's relatively low corporate tax rates, US companies began offshoring of software, electronic, and pharmaceutical intellectual property to Ireland for export. This helped create a high-tech "boom" which led to Ireland becoming one of the richest EU countries.

NAFTA
In 1994 the North American Free Trade Agreement (NAFTA) went into effect, and it increased the velocity of physical restructuring.

The plan to create free trade areas (such as Free Trade Area of the Americas) has not yet been successful. In 2005, offshoring of skilled work, also referred to as knowledge work, dramatically increased from the US, which fed the growing worries about threats of job loss.

Offshore outsourcing
There are four basic types of offshore outsourcing:
 Information technology outsourcing (ITO) is where outsourcing related to technology or internet such as computer programming.
 Business process outsourcing (BPO) involves contracting out of operational functions to a third party service provider.
 Offshore software development
 Knowledge process outsourcing (KPO) is a type of outsourcing which involves or requires a more advanced technical skill and a higher level of expertise.

Criteria
The general criteria for a job to be offshore-able are:
 There is a significant wage difference between the original and offshore countries;
 Remote work is possible in the job;
 The work can be transmitted over the Internet;
 The work is repeatable.

Source of conflict
The opposing sides regarding offshoring, outsourcing, and offshore outsourcing are those seeking government intervention and Protectionism versus the side advocating Free Trade.

Jobs formerly held by U.S. workers have been lost, even as underdeveloped countries such as Brazil and Turkey flourish. Free-trade advocates suggest economies as a whole will obtain a net benefit from labor offshoring, but it is unclear if the displaced receive a net benefit.

Some wages overseas are rising. A study by the U.S. Bureau of Labor Statistics found that Chinese wages were almost tripled in the seven years following 2002. Research suggests that these wage increases could redirect some offshoring elsewhere.

Increased training and education has been advocated to offset trade-related displacements, but it is no longer a comparative advantage of high-wage nations because education costs are lower in low-wage countries.

See also

Anti-globalization movement
Borderless selling
Call center security
Decline and Fall of the American Programmer
Domestic sourcing
Follow-the-sun
Free trade controversy
Friendshoring
Global delivery model
Global labor arbitrage
Global sourcing
Globality
Globally integrated enterprise
Guest worker
Labor shortage
List of international trade topics
Low-cost country sourcing
Nearshoring
Offshore company
Offshoring Research Network
Programmers Guild
Restructuring
Runaway production
Tax haven

By sector:
Information technology consulting
Offshore custom software development

References

External links

An Atlas of Offshore Outsourcing by David E. Gumpert (BusinessWeek online)

Further reading
 Consulate General of the Kingdom of The Netherlands Guangzhou (2011). Outsourcing Comparison Study South-East Asia: China, India, Vietnam 2011-2012.
 
 
 
 Alan S. Blinder, "Offshoring: The Next Industrial Revolution?" in Foreign Affairs, Vol. 85, No. 2 (March/April 2006), pp. 113–128.
 
 
 Thomas L. Friedman, The World is Flat: A Brief History of the Twenty-first Century (2005). 
 
 
 Catherine L. Mann & Jacob Funk Kirkegaard, Accelerating the Globalization of America: The Role for Information Technology, Institute for International Economics, Washington D.C., Peterson Institute for International Economics (June 2006).
 Stephan Manning, Silvia Massini & Arie Y. Lewin, A Dynamic Perspective on Next-Generation Offshoring: The Global Sourcing of Science and Engineering Talent, Academy of Management Perspectives, Vol. 22, No. 3 (October 2008), pp. 35–54. 
 
 
 
 
 

 
Business terms
Economic globalization
International business
International trade
Offshore finance
Outsourcing